Gustava is a feminine form of Gustav or Gustavus. People with the name include:

Gustava Aigner (1906–1987), Austrian geologist and palaeontologist
Gustava Kielland (1800–1889), Norwegian author and missionary pioneer
Gustava Johanna Stenborg (1776–1819), was a Swedish artist

Swedish feminine given names